The 2014 IIHF Women's Challenge Cup of Asia was an international women's ice hockey tournament run by the International Ice Hockey Federation. The tournament took place between 9 March and 13 March 2014 in Harbin, China and was the fourth edition held since its formation in 2010 under the IIHF Challenge Cup of Asia series of tournaments. China won the tournament, their first title since 2010, after defeating North Korea in the gold medal game. South Korea beat in the bronze medal game Australia to claim third place.

Overview
The 2014 IIHF Women's Challenge Cup of Asia began on 9 March 2014 in Harbin, China with the games played at Harbin University. China and South Korea both returned after competing in the 2012 tournament. North Korea returned having last competed in the 2010 tournament while Australia made their debut in the IIHF Women's Challenge Cup of Asia. Both Japan and the Chinese junior team did not return, having competed in the 2012 edition.

The tournament was structured around a single round-robin before the teams advanced to the playoffs based on their round-robin positions. China finished the round-robin after winning all three of their games and advanced to the gold medal game against North Korea who finished in second place, losing only to China. South Korea finished the round in third place after managing only one win and advanced to the bronze medal match against Australia who had finished in fourth place after failing to win any of their three games. China defeated North Korea 2-1 in the gold medal game and claimed their second IIHF Women's Challenge Cup of Asia title having previously won in 2010. North Korea picked up the silver medal, improving on their performance from 2010 where they claimed third place. South Korea defeated Australia in the bronze medal game to finish third.

China's Fang Xin finished as the tournament top scorer with seven points and was named the tournaments best forward. Ri Hye Yong of North Korea was named the best goaltender by the IIHF Directorate and China's Liu Zhixin won the best defenceman award. Wang Yuqing of China finished as the tournaments leading goaltender with a save percentage of 96.67.

Preliminary round

Standings

Fixtures
All times are local. (CST – UTC+8)

Playoff round

Bronze medal game
All times are local. (CST – UTC+8)

Gold medal game
All times are local. (CST – UTC+8)

Ranking and statistics
The final standings of the tournament according to IIHF:

Scoring leaders
List shows the top ten skaters sorted by points, then goals, assists, and the lower penalties in minutes.

Leading goaltenders
Only the top goaltenders, based on save percentage, who have played at least 40% of their team's minutes are included in this list.

References

External links
Tournament page at IIHF.com

IIHF Women's Challenge Cup of Asia
IIHF Women's Challenge Cup of Asia
IIHF Women's Challenge Cup of Asia
IIHF Women's Challenge Cup of Asia
IIHF Women's Challenge Cup of Asia
International ice hockey competitions hosted by China